This is a list of noble titles commonly used at the Surakarta and Yogyakarta courts, including the Mangkunegaran and Pakualaman palaces. As the symbols and centres of Javanese culture, the sovereigns of both these courts still hold high esteem in Javanese society and Indonesian society in general. The Princely Families are still known by their noble titles. Many people with distant familial relations to the Palaces also use noble titles, which sometimes are included in the official register of the names. Abdi dalem with prominent stature are also granted titles. The sovereigns also still grant titles to certain persons deemed helpful in maintaining Javanese traditions and the dignity of the royal courts, even to non-Javanese.

As Indonesia is not a monarchy, the Government of Indonesia does not confer any noble titles on its citizens. However, noble titles are still recognised officially as distinct from personal names. This is in contrast with the situation in e.g. Germany or Austria, in which personal names were forced to be used after the abolition of the monarchies. Minister of Home Affairs' Regulation no. 25 year 2011 is one example of such state regulations that recognises and governs the use of noble titles within the Indonesian administration. Even the second vice-president of Indonesia (1973-1978) — who was also the sultan of Yogyakarta — was known officially by his regnal name, Hamengkubuwono IX.

This list is created to help readers from a non-Javanese background to distinguish the noble titles from the personal names of individuals commonly known only by their noble titles. Notable examples are Raden Adjeng (R.A.) Kartini, Raden Panji (R.P.) Soeroso, and M. T. (Mas Tirtodharmo) Haryono.

Note that in Javanese alphabet the phoneme /ɔ/ is written with same letter and sign as 'a'. In Indonesian newspapers the sound /ɔ/ is generally written with the letter 'o', hence allowing for another mistake in pronunciation (with the phoneme /o/. The letter å in this list is used to show such difference and to prevent such mistake. The same purpose is also intended with the use of the letter è to represent /ɛ/. Plain e is pronounced /ə/.

The common abbreviations in Indonesian modern spelling are written next to each of the titles.

Titles for Male
 Sampéyan Dalem Ingkang Sinuhun Kanjeng Susuhunan - SIKS 
 Kanjeng Pangeran Adipati Aryå - KPAA
 Kanjeng Gusti Pangeran Haryå - KGPH 
 Gusti Bendårå Pangeran Haryå - GBPH 
 Kanjeng Pangeran Haryå - KPA 
 Kanjeng Radèn Haryå - KRA 
 Kanjeng Radèn Haryå Tumenggung - KRHT 
 Raden Mas - RM 
 Raden - R 
 Mas - M 
 Radèn Ngabèhi - RNg
 Radèn Panji - RP 
 Radèn Tumenggung - RT

Titles for Female
 Gusti Kanjeng Ratu - GKR 
 Bendårå Raden Ayu - BRAy 
 Radèn Ayu - RAy 
 Radèn Adjeng - RA 
 Radèn Rårå - RRr 
 Rårå - Rr
 Nyai Mas Tumenggung

References

External links
 http://kelembagaan.pnri.go.id/beranda/berita/prnview_id.php?id=527

Indonesian royalty
Lists of nobility